Ark II is an American live-action science fiction television series, aimed at children, that aired on CBS from September 11 to December 18, 1976, (with reruns continuing through November 13, 1977 and reruns returning from September 16, 1978, through August 25, 1979) as part of its weekend line-up. Only 15 half-hour episodes were produced. The program's central characters were created by Martin Roth; Ted Post helped Roth develop its core format.

Series overview
The opening titles for each episode, as narrated first by executive producer Lou Scheimer (using his then uncredited pseudonym Erik Gunden), then by the voice of Terry Lester, who portrayed Jonah, summarized the show's backstory:

Ark II had a racially mixed cast starring Terry Lester as Ark II's commander, Jonah, Jean Marie Hon as Ruth, José Flores as Samuel, and a chimpanzee named Moochie (owned and trained by Darrell Keener) responding to the name of Adam and voiced by Lou Scheimer. The show's premise was inspired by the story of Noah's Ark, and the characters were given names taken from the Hebrew Bible. It was set in a post-apocalyptic 25th century (specifically, 2476, the show having debuted in 1976), after Earth's civilizations had been decimated by the effects of waste, pollution, and warfare, falling back to a civilization comparable to the Dark Ages. The surviving scientists pooled their knowledge and resources, training three young people (and the chimp, who was capable of speech and abstract reasoning) to search for remnants of humanity, reintroducing lost ideas as they traveled the barren landscape in the high-tech Ark II.

The show mentions a "headquarters" and that the crew are scientists. The titles "commander" and "captain" are both used to refer to Jonah. All the installments began and ended with numbered entries in the Ark II's log, which Lester, in character as Jonah, narrated in voiceover.  Like other Filmation shows, Ark II also had a moral lesson derived from the preceding events seen in the episode.  However, the epilogue log entry narrated by Jonah is used to deliver the moral rather than have any of the characters break the fourth wall (i.e. speak directly to the camera and TV viewers) to deliver the moral which was common in most Filmation shows.

Production
In "The Launch of Ark II," the documentary filmed for the release of the DVD set, Lou Scheimer and others mention that the program was filmed during the summer of 1976 predominantly on location at Paramount Ranch near Malibu, California. Establishing footage of the Ark traveling at high speed was shot at the Rogers Dry Lake bed at Edwards Air Force Base. The show was filmed at a rate of two episodes per week.

According to Lou Scheimer, Moochie the chimpanzee was very angry and aggressive as a result of mistreatment by his trainer, sometimes witnessed by the cast and crew.

Technology
The series is best-remembered for its eponymous vehicle: a futuristic-looking six-wheeled combination RV and mobile laboratory. The 44 ft long vehicle was a fiberglass body on a 1971 Ford C-Series (C-700) cabover, by the Brubaker Group. The front end of the Ark II prop was later re-used as the nose portion of the Seeker spacecraft in the Filmation series Space Academy and Jason of Star Command.

It is sometimes incorrectly reported that the Ark II was built by Dean Jeffries, who constructed various fantastic vehicles for science-fiction films and television. These include the Landmaster for the film Damnation Alley, with which the Ark II is sometimes confused. In addition, the series also featured a jetpack called the Jet Jumper, and the Ark Roamer, a smaller, 4-wheeled all-terrain vehicle built by Brubaker from a modified Brubaker Box, a kit car using a 1968 Volkswagen Beetle sedan chassis. The Roamer was carried in the rear of the Ark II.

Guest stars
Guest stars included Jonathan Harris, Malachi Throne, Jim Backus, Geoffrey Lewis, Philip Abbott, Robert Ridgely, Helen Hunt, and Robby the Robot as the title character built by Samuel in the episode "The Robot." Helen Hunt appears in the episode "Omega." Actor Daniel Selby auditioned for the role of Samuel, but Jose Flores won the role.

Episodes

Home media
BCI Eclipse LLC (under its Ink & Paint classic animation entertainment brand), under a license it had obtained from Entertainment Rights, released Ark II: The Complete Series on DVD in Region 1 on November 7, 2006. The BCI Eclipse 4-disc set included many special features, and the episodes were presented uncut, digitally remastered and presented in their original production order.

Unlike many of the in-house Filmation DVD releases in Region 1 by BCI Entertainment’s Ink & Paint brand, this series was sourced from the original NTSC film elements, with correct speed and pitch.

Savor Ediciones, S.A. released Ark II: La Serie Completa as a 4-disc Region 2 DVD box set on May 20, 2009. Unlike the BCI set, this release only contains the episodes, no bonus features. Being a Region 2 release for Spain, the soundtrack is the dubbed Spanish version. Unfortunately, the original English soundtrack was not included, even as a secondary option. The discs are encoded in the PAL video format.

References

External links
 
 Ark II at Retro Junk (has the intro video)
 Unofficial Ark II Appreciation Site
 Ark II at 70's Live Kid DVD
 Memorable TV: Ark II episode guide
 Ark II at OldFutures.com

1970s American children's television series
1970s American science fiction television series
1976 American television series debuts
1976 American television series endings
American children's science fiction television series
CBS original programming
English-language television shows
Post-apocalyptic television series
Television series by Filmation
Television series by Universal Television
Television series set in the 25th century
Television shows about chimpanzees